The 1912 Hong Kong Sanitary Board election was held on 19 January 1912 for the two unofficial seats in the Sanitary Board of Hong Kong.

Only ratepayers who were included in the Special and Common Jury Lists of the years or ratepayers who are exempted from serving on Juries on account of their professional avocations, unofficial members of the Executive or Legislative Council, or categories of profession were entitled to vote at the election.

Overview of outcome

References
 Endacott, G. B. Government and people in Hong Kong, 1841-1962 : a constitutional history Hong Kong University Press. (1964) 
 The Hong Kong Government Gazette
 Twentieth century impressions of Hong Kong, Shanghai, and other Treaty Ports of China. Their history, people, commerce, industries, and resources; editor in chief: Arnold Wright, assistant editor: H.A. Cartwright. Published 1908 by Lloyd's Greater Britain Pub. Co. in London.

Hong Kong
1912 in Hong Kong
Sanitary
Uncontested elections
January 1912 events
Hong Kong